The River is an album by Norwegian pianist Ketil Bjørnstad with American cellist David Darling recorded in 1996 and released on the ECM label in 1997.

Reception
The Allmusic review awarded the album 3 stars.

Track listing
ECM – ECM 1593.

All tracks are composed by Ketil Bjørnstad.

Personnel
Ketil Bjørnstad: piano
David Darling: cello

References

1997 albums
ECM Records albums
Ketil Bjørnstad albums
David Darling (musician) albums
Albums produced by Manfred Eicher